Haris Tabaković (born 20 June 1994) is a Swiss professional footballer who plays as a striker for Austrian Bundesliga club Austria Wien.

Club career
Tabaković made his debut during the 2012–13 season. On 6 January 2014, it was announced that Tabakovic would join Challenge League team Wil on loan on a 1.5-year contract that would keep him there until 2015.

Debrecen
On 2 August 2017, he was signed by Nemzeti Bajnokság I club Debreceni VSC. It was also revealed that Tabakovic signed a two-year contract.

Austria Lustenau
On 14 September 2020, he signed a two-year contract with Austria Lustenau.

International career
Born in Switzerland, Tabaković is of Bosnian descent. He was a Swiss youth international.

Career statistics

Club

Honours
Austria Lustenau
 Austrian Football Second League: 2021–22

References

External links
 

1994 births
Living people
Sportspeople from the canton of Solothurn
Swiss people of Bosnia and Herzegovina descent
Association football forwards
Swiss men's footballers
Switzerland youth international footballers
Switzerland under-21 international footballers
BSC Young Boys players
FC Wil players
Grasshopper Club Zürich players
Debreceni VSC players
Diósgyőri VTK players
SC Austria Lustenau players
FK Austria Wien players
Swiss Super League players
Swiss Challenge League players
Nemzeti Bajnokság I players
2. Liga (Austria) players
Austrian Football Bundesliga players
Swiss expatriate footballers
Expatriate footballers in Hungary
Swiss expatriate sportspeople in Hungary
Expatriate footballers in Austria
Swiss expatriate sportspeople in Austria